Aradus lugubris is a species of flat bug in the family Aradidae. It is found in Europe and Northern Asia (excluding China) and North America.

Subspecies
These two subspecies belong to the species Aradus lugubris:
 Aradus lugubris lugubris Fallén, 1807
 Aradus lugubris nigricornis Reuter, 1900

References

External links

 

Aradidae
Articles created by Qbugbot
Insects described in 1807